The thick-billed seed finch (Sporophila funerea) is a species of bird in the family Thraupidae, but was until recently placed in Emberizidae. It is found widely in shrubby and grassy areas from southern Mexico, through Central America, to the Chocó in Colombia and Ecuador. It is replaced by the closely related chestnut-bellied seed finch in South America east of the Andes, as well as the valleys of Cauca and Magdalena in Colombia. The two have often been considered conspecific as the lesser seed-finch (Oryzoborus angolensis).

The male is almost entirely black, with a small white wing patch. The female is a rich brown all over. They are both very similar to the all-black Caribbean slope form of the variable seedeater. It is distinguished, however, by a larger bill with a straight culmen.

References

External links

 
 
 
 
 
 

Sporophila
Birds of Mexico
Birds of Belize
Birds of Guatemala
Birds of Honduras
Birds of Nicaragua
Birds of Costa Rica
Birds of Panama
Birds of Colombia
Birds of Ecuador
thick-billed seed finch
thick-billed seed finch
Taxonomy articles created by Polbot